Vĩnh Tiến may refer to the following places in Vietnam:

 Vĩnh Tiến, Vĩnh Bảo District, Hải Phòng
 Vĩnh Tiến, Kim Bôi District, Hòa Bình
 Vĩnh Tiến, Tràng Định District, Lạng Sơn
 Vĩnh Tiến, Vĩnh Lộc District, Thanh Hóa